Charles Joy may refer to:

 Charles Frederick Joy (1849–1921), U.S. Representative from Missouri
 C. Turner Joy (1895–1956), admiral of the United States Navy
 Charles Joy (engineer) (1911–1989), British aeronautical engineer
 Charles A. Joy (1823–1891), American chemist